Wilbur Hayes was an American sports executive. He owned the Cleveland Buckeyes Negro league baseball franchise from 1942 to 1950. Hayes survived a car accident in 1942.

References

External links
Cleveland Buckeyes

Year of birth missing
Year of death missing
Baseball executives
Negro league baseball executives